Nuno Miguel Mendes Conceição (born 24 September 1971), nicknamed Nuno Raquete is a retired Portuguese football midfielder. He played on the Portuguese second tier for Naval. He later became a manager.

References

1971 births
Living people
Portuguese footballers
Associação Naval 1º de Maio players
C.D. Feirense players
S.C. Pombal players
Académico de Viseu F.C. players
F.C. Oliveira do Hospital players
G.D. Sourense players
Association football midfielders
Segunda Divisão players
Sportspeople from Coimbra